Dying Light: The Following is an expansion pack for the 2015 survival horror game Dying Light. The game was developed by Techland, published by Warner Bros. Interactive Entertainment, and released for Linux, Windows, PlayStation 4, and Xbox One on February 9, 2016. The expansion adds characters, a story campaign, weapons, and gameplay mechanics.

Dying Light: The Following – Enhanced Edition includes Dying Light, Dying Light: The Following, and downloadable content released for the original game, except for three DLCs: Harran Ranger Bundle, Gun Psycho Bundle, and Volatile Hunter Bundle.

Gameplay

Set in a map that is twice as large as the two previous maps of Dying Light, The Following'''s gameplay is similar to that of the main game where the infected are slow and fragile during daytime, and become aggressive and fast at night time. Players can use parkour movements, such as climbing ledges, leaping, sliding, jumping and zip-lining, to move between places and kill enemies. One of the new features introduced is a drivable dune buggy. Players can use them to travel across the game's world quickly and mow down enemies. It has its own separate skill tree, and weapons, including spikes, flamethrowers, UV lights, electrical cages and other upgrades can be added to the buggy to increase its combat abilities. The buggy's performance and efficiency are affected by factors including the power of its suspension, engine, and brakes. Players can also choose from 40 different paintjobs to customize their car, and must collect fuel in order to drive the buggy.

The game features several new weapons, such as a crossbow and a variety of new firearms such as submachine guns and revolvers. A new "bounty" mode, which split missions into three different categories: "Basic", "Dailies", and "Community", is introduced. The missions and objectives included in this mode change every day, and players gain experience points by completing them. The game also features a new difficulty mode named "Nightmare Mode", which extends the duration of nighttime, and increases the strength and health of enemies. Every action made in this mode drains stamina from the player's character. Players do not have to complete the base game before starting the expansion; however, the character progression players earned in The Following will be carried to the base game. Similar to the first game, the game supports a four-player cooperative multiplayer mode. The asymmetrical multiplayer mode from the first game, Be The Zombie, also returns in The Following.

Plot
Protagonist Kyle Crane learns from a survivor near death about a supposed cure to the virus. With the Tower running short on Antizin and Camden's efforts to produce a cure still unsuccessful, Crane decides to go investigate this supposed immunity. He heads out to the countryside, where he discovers that many of the survivors out there have converted to a religious cult called the Children of the Sun, who worship the Mother which is apparently the source of their immunity to the virus. In order to earn the cult's trust and learn more about the immunity, Crane decides to assist the survivors. Eventually, one of the Faceless, the high-ranking members of the cult, approaches Crane and privately admits that their immunity is gained through a special elixir they had discovered, but like Antizin, it only suppresses the infection and does not fully cure it. The Faceless also reveal that they are working on a permanent cure, and promise that in exchange for his help, they will give Crane the cure to take back to Harran.

Crane is then tasked with assisting a man named Atilla, who is working on an important project for the Mother. Atilla tells Crane that the Children of the Sun believe in a prophecy where a chosen one would rise up to become the prophet of the God of the Sun and purify the infection. He also reveals that the Mother was Jasmine, the wife of a local military Colonel who was involved in the experiments that caused the outbreak, but was bitten during the outbreak. Before succumbing to the infection himself, the Colonel gave Atilla a secret code that Atilla passes on to Crane. Attila then commits suicide in an attempt to invoke the prophecy, but it fails to occur. Crane then discovers that the remnants of Rais' gang have also traveled to the countryside to search for the supposed cure as well. Rais' thugs stage an attack on the Mother's base in a nearby dam, but when Crane arrives, he finds both Rais' bandits and the Faceless all dead.

Entering the dam, Crane discovers that the Mother has been turned into a sentient volatile. She reveals that the dam was a secret military facility that held a special chemical substance. However, rather than being a cure for the virus, the elixir instead slowly turns whoever uses it into a sentient volatile, like it did to the Mother. During the day, she is able to retain her mental faculties and has been given telepathic abilities in order to communicate, but at night, she becomes an uncontrollable feral monster. The Mother tells Crane that the only way to stop the infection is to summon the God of the Sun to purify the land, sacrificing everybody in Harran in the process. At this point, Crane can choose to either listen to the Mother, or defy her.

If Crane chooses to defy the Mother, the Mother attacks, forces him to drink the elixir and attempts to kill him, but Crane eventually prevails and kills her. Taking what's left of the elixir, Crane leaves the dam, suffering continuous blackouts, and finds himself in a populated area seemingly outside the quarantine, but discovers that his exposure to the elixir has already turned him into a sentient volatile. As night falls, the infected Crane lets out a feral scream as a nearby mother and her children watch in terror.

If Crane chooses to listen to the Mother, she leads him to a nuclear warhead that was originally meant to be a fail-safe to contain the outbreak. Crane inputs the code Atilla had given him, which activates the warhead, presumably destroying all of Harran and killing all of the survivors and infected, taking the virus with them.

DevelopmentThe Following was developed by Techland and published by Warner Bros. Interactive Entertainment. According to lead designer Maciej Binkowski, the team decided to implement a dune buggy into The Following as they felt that it was a "fantasy" of the zombie genre, and they missed the opportunity when developing the base game. The process of implementing them was described as "hard", as they must ensure that the new system must work functionally with other gameplay mechanics, most notably the parkour system. The development team looked at players' feedback and requests regarding the first Dying Light, and decided to add the most demanded features, including a new story and new firearms, to the game. The new campaign lasts for at least ten hours, and centers around the theme "mystery". Gameplay elements from The Following were originally part of the core Dying Light game, but were later left behind as the core game was becoming too large for the team to handle. According to Binkowski, the development of the game continued after the release of the first game, and numerous improvements were made to the parkour system, animation, artificial intelligence and graphics.

In May 2015, it was announced that the development of another Techland video game, Hellraid, had been put on hold so as to allow the studio to allocate resources and time to concentrate on the development of the Dying Light franchise. The game was teased by Techland on July 23, 2015, before being officially announced a week later. To reflect the increased scope and scale of the expansion, Techland raised the game's price on November 25, 2015. Although the game can be bought separately, it was included in Dying Light: The Following – Enhanced Edition, which bundles The Following with the base game and its downloadable content, except for three DLCs: Harran Ranger Bundle, Gun Psycho Bundle and Volatile Hunter Bundle. Players of the original game can upgrade to the Enhanced Edition for free. The Following is also free for players who have purchased the base game's Season Pass. The Enhanced Edition were released on February 9, 2016.

ReceptionDying Light: The Following received "generally favorable reviews" from critics, according to review aggregator Metacritic.

Kevin Dunsmore of Hardcore Gamer gave the game a 4 out of 5 saying, "The Following expands Dying Light in a meaningful new way, giving fans something fun to salivate over." Scott Butterworth from GameSpot'' rated the game an 8/10 saying, "The Following evolves Dying Light's formula by adding substantial new mechanics that  or even reframe familiar gameplay elements."

The extension got to number 5 in the US downloads chart.

References

External links

2016 video games
Action role-playing video games
Dystopian video games
2010s horror video games
Linux games
MacOS games
Multiplayer and single-player video games
Mutants in fiction
Open-world video games
Parkour video games
PlayStation 4 games
PlayStation 4 Pro enhanced games
Post-apocalyptic video games
Role-playing video games
Survival video games
Techland games
Video games about cannibalism
Video games about cults
Video games about viral outbreaks
Video games about zombies
Video games developed in Poland
Video games set in Turkey
Video game expansion packs
Video games with alternate endings
Video games with Steam Workshop support
Video games with user-generated gameplay content
Warner Bros. video games
Windows games
Xbox One games
Xbox One X enhanced games